Solemn may refer to:

"Solemn", a song by Tribal Tech from the album Dr. Hee 1987
"Solemn", a song by Arcane Roots from the album Melancholia Hymns 2017

See also
 Solemnity, a feast day of the highest rank in the Roman Rite